Rhoptobaris is a genus of flower weevils in the beetle family Curculionidae. There are about five described species in Rhoptobaris.

Species
These five species belong to the genus Rhoptobaris:
 Rhoptobaris canescens LeConte, 1876
 Rhoptobaris cylindrifera (Casey, 1892)
 Rhoptobaris obrieni Prena, 2012
 Rhoptobaris piercei Prena, 2012
 Rhoptobaris scolopax (Say, 1832)

References

Further reading

 

Baridinae
Articles created by Qbugbot